Life Is a Bi... is the second extended play by South Korean singer Bibi. It was released on April 28, 2021, through Feel Ghood Music.

Background 
In an interview with BNT, Bibi explained why she named the album Life is a Bi....
Everything in life came to me like temptation. I came to think of life as a bad bitch that teases me and cannot be understood.

Music and lyrics 
According to Seoul Beats, "Bibi likens her perspective of life to experiencing inner conflicts from a toxic relationship." In “Piri the dog,” she "reveals the severe emotional consequences of a codependent relationship, likening herself to an abandoned dog." "Birthday Cake" is about not knowing your own worth, such as in the lyrics, "Nobody told me I get grands for hour and half so I sold it for one hunnit".

Critical reception 

Kim Do-yeon of IZM rated the album 3 out of 5 stars. According to her, "Bibi tries to draw empathy from listeners by honestly telling her story in a short time. The album will comfort those in their 20s and help those turning 20 overcome difficult moments."

Kim Hyo-jin of Rhythmer rated the album 2.5 out of 5 stars. According to her, "the depiction of the universality of tragedy is interesting." However, "the music to support it is unpolished and the story was not fully developed due to the small number of songs."

Juliette Garcia of Seoul Therapy rated the album 9 out of 10 points. According to her, "Bibi is a great lyricist and her wits are not lost in this album. She gives a great insight into life and relationships in her own whimsical, sexy and sensitive way."

Year-end lists

Track listing

Charts

Weekly charts

Monthly charts

Sales

References 

2021 EPs
Contemporary R&B albums by South Korean artists
Hip hop albums by South Korean artists
Korean-language EPs